Ansiktet may refer to:

Ansiktet, the Swedish title of a 1958 film by Ingmar Bergman known as The Magician
Ansiktet (band), Swedish singing duo